John David Zinda (April 2, 1938 – July 14, 1995) was an American football coach and college athletics administrator. He served as the head football coach for Claremont-Mudd, the combined athletics program of Claremont McKenna College and Harvey Mudd College in Claremont, California, from 1968 to 1994, compiling a record of 92–141–4. Zinda was the head football coach at Royal Oak High School in Covina, California from 1965 to 1967. 

Zinda became director of the Claremont-Mudd combined athletic department in 1983.  He died of leukemia on July 14, 1995.

Head coaching record

College

Notes

References

1938 births
1995 deaths
Claremont-Mudd-Scripps Stags and Athenas athletic directors
Claremont-Mudd-Scripps Stags football coaches
Claremont McKenna College faculty
High school football coaches in California
People from Inglewood, California
Coaches of American football from California
Deaths from cancer in California
Deaths from leukemia